Dacryodes rubiginosa is a tree in the family Burseraceae. The specific epithet  is from the Latin meaning "rust-coloured", referring to the tomentum.

Description
The flowers are tomentose.

Distribution and habitat
Dacryodes rubiginosa grows naturally in Peninsular Malaysia and Borneo. Its habitat is lowland forest from sea-level to  altitude.

References

rubiginosa
Trees of Peninsular Malaysia
Trees of Borneo
Plants described in 1932
Taxa named by Herman Johannes Lam
Taxa named by Alfred William Bennett